Payne Brook is a river that begins southeast of the Village of Madison in Madison County, New York. It flows west then turns southwest before flowing into Lake Moraine. It then exits the lake and flows southwest through the Village of Hamilton, flowing through Taylor Lake in the village, before converging with the Chenango River by Randallsville.

References

Rivers of New York (state)
Rivers of Madison County, New York